In poker and gaming "buying in" is the process of entering a tournament that requires an up-front payment. The size of the payment, otherwise known as the "buy in", determines the total winning prize pool and also contains a fee, otherwise known as the rake, that is paid to the house.

For example, a 50-person capacity tournament could cost $55 entry per player. In poker terms, this could be presented as "$50+$5", meaning $50 goes to the prize pool to pay the eventual winners and $5 (10%) is the rake. In this example, the prize pool would contain $2500 and the house would take a total of $250 (i.e. 10%).

References

Poker gameplay and terminology
https://www.pokerdictionary.net/glossary/buy-in/